Haber is a lunar impact crater on the lunar far side near the northern pole. The crater was adopted and named after German chemist Fritz Haber by the IAU in 2009.

References

 
 
 
 
 
 
 
 
 
 
 
 

Impact craters on the Moon